Bojan Ušumović (born 24 June 1988) is a Serbian football defender who plays for Bačka 1901 in Serbian League Vojvodina.

He has represented a number of clubs from Serbia, Bosnia and Herzegovina, Montenegro and Albania, and his career highlight were the 2 half-seasons he spent with BSK Borča covering from start till end of 2011 when the club played in the Serbian SuperLiga.

Later, during 2016 when he was under contract again with Bačka 1901, a club traditionally linked with the Croatian community in Vojvodina, he was part of the Croats of Serbia team at the 2016 EUROPEADA.

References

External links
 
 Bojan Ušumović stats at utakmica.rs 
 

1988 births
Living people
Sportspeople from Subotica
Association football defenders
Serbian footballers
FK Palić players
FK Senta players
FK BSK Borča players
FK Radnički Sombor players
OFK Mladenovac players
FK Bačka 1901 players
Serbian SuperLiga players
FK Jedinstvo Bijelo Polje players
Montenegrin First League players
Croats of Vojvodina